Woodbridge Rural District was a rural district within the administrative county of East Suffolk between 1894 and 1934. It was created out of the earlier Woodbridge rural sanitary district. It surrounded the town of Woodbridge, which had earlier been created as an urban district.

In 1934, under a County Review Order, Woodbridge Rural District was abolished and its parishes transferred to the new Deben Rural District.

Statistics

Parishes
Woodbridge RD contained the following parishes:

 Alderton
 Alnesbourn Priory
 Bawdsey
 Boulge
 Boyton
 Bredfield
 Brightwell
 Bromeswell
 Bucklesham
 Burgh
 Capel St Andrew
 Charsfield
 Clopton
 Culpho
 Dallinghoo
 Dallinghoo Wield
 Debach
 Falkenham
 Foxhall
 Great Bealings
 Grundisburgh
 Hasketon
 Hemley
 Hollesley
 Kesgrave
 Kirton
 Levington
 Little Bealings
 Martlesham
 Melton
 Nacton
 Newbourne
 Otley
 Pettistree
 Playford
 Purdis Farm
 Ramsholt
 Rushmere St Andrew
 Shottisham
 Stratton Hall
 Sutton
 Trimley St Martin
 Trimley St Mary
 Tuddenham St Martin
 Ufford
 Waldringfield
 Westerfield
 Witnesham

References

History of Suffolk
Districts of England created by the Local Government Act 1894
Rural districts of England